Zulphis subfasciata is a species of beetle in the family Cerambycidae, and the only species in the genus Zulphis. It was described by Fairmaire in 1893.

References

Dorcasominae
Beetles described in 1893
Monotypic beetle genera